The Tupelo Public School District is a public school district based in Tupelo, Mississippi (USA). The school district currently has 13 schools, grades Pre-K - 12th, that are in regular function throughout the year.

It includes most of the city of Tupelo and a small portion of Saltillo.

Schools

High school 
Grades 9-12
Tupelo High School

Middle schools
Grades 7-8
Tupelo Middle School
Grade 6
Milam Elementary School

Elementary schools
Grades 3-5
Carver Elementary School
Lawndale Elementary School
Rankin Elementary School
2000-2001 National Blue Ribbon School
Grades K-2
Church Street Elementary School
2000-2001 National Blue Ribbon School
Joyner Elementary School
Lawhon Elementary School
Parkway Elementary School
Pierce Street Elementary School
Thomas Street Elementary School
1989-1990 and 2000-2001 National Blue Ribbon School
Preschool
Early Childhood Education Center (ECEC)

Alternative school 
 Grades K-12
 Fillmore Center

Demographics

2006-07 school year
There were a total of 7,190 students enrolled in the Tupelo Public School District during the 2006–2007 school year. The gender makeup of the district was 50% female and 50% male. The racial makeup of the district was 46.24% African American, 49.86% White, 2.21% Hispanic, 1.66% Asian, and 0.03% Native American. 42.2% of the district's students were eligible to receive free lunch.

Previous school years

Accountability statistics

See also
List of school districts in Mississippi

References

School district homepage
 

Tupelo, Mississippi
Education in Lee County, Mississippi
School districts in Mississippi